Milano Villapizzone is a surface railway station in Milan, Italy and serves the suburb of Villapizzone. It opened in 2002 as part of the Milan Passante railway. It is located on Via Arnaldo Fusinato.

The station, together with Bovisa station, also serves the Bovisa campus of the Politecnico di Milano. The train services are operated by Trenord.

Train services
The station is served by the following services:

Milan Metropolitan services (S5) Varese - Rho - Milan - Treviglio
Milan Metropolitan services (S6) Novara - Rho - Milan - Treviglio
Milan Metropolitan services (S11) Rho - Milan - Monza - Seregno - Como - Chiasso

See also
Railway stations in Milan
Milan suburban railway service

References

Villapizzone
Railway stations opened in 2002
Milan S Lines stations
2002 establishments in Italy
Railway stations in Italy opened in the 21st century